Zachary Martin Nunn (born May 4, 1979) is an American politician and former member of the Iowa Air National Guard who has served as the U.S. representative for Iowa's 3rd congressional district since 2023. A member of the Republican Party, he was a member of the Iowa Senate for the 15th district from 2019 to 2023 and the Iowa House of Representatives for the 30th district from 2015 to 2019.

Early life and education
Nunn was born on May 4, 1979, in Story City, Iowa, and raised in Altoona. He graduated from Southeast Polk High School in 1998. He earned a Bachelor of Arts degree in political science and international relations from Drake University in 2002. He has a Master of Military Art and Science from the Air Command and Staff College of Air University (2004) and a Master of Studies in international relations and national security studies from the University of Cambridge (2007).

Career

Early career 
Nunn was a member of the United States Air Force and later the Iowa Air National Guard. In 2021, he held the rank of lieutenant colonel and was commander of the 233rd Intelligence Squadron, 132nd Wing, Iowa Air National Guard. Nunn also worked as a cybersecurity consultant.

Nunn was a member of the research staff for Sir Peter Bottomley, a member of the British House of Commons, in 2002. He was a member of U.S. Senator Chuck Grassley's legislative staff in 2004. Nunn was later director of cybersecurity policy for the United States National Security Council.

Iowa Legislature
Nunn was a member of the Iowa House of Representatives from 2015 to 2019. He was a member of the Iowa Senate beginning in 2019.

U.S House of Representatives

Elections

2022 

In 2021, Nunn announced his candidacy for Iowa's 3rd congressional district in the 2022 election against incumbent Cindy Axne, the only Democrat in Iowa's congressional delegation. The 3rd district, which covers central Iowa, became more rural and Republican-leaning after the 2020 redistricting cycle, taking in nine new counties. The race was considered among the nation's most competitive House races. Nunn was endorsed by Donald Trump, Nikki Haley, and Tom Cotton, and easily won the June Republican primary election against two other candidates.

Committee assignment
 Committee on Financial Services

Political positions

Abortion 
During a May 2022 Republican primary debate, Nunn raised his hand indicating he opposes abortion without exceptions. In August 2022, he said he does support legal exceptions to allow some abortions, including in cases of rape and incest.

Infrastructure 
Nunn opposes the Bipartisan Infrastructure Act, and said there was far too much waste in the law.

January 6 
In an April 2022 appearance as a congressional candidate, Nunn said of the January 6 United States Capitol attack, "If a bunch of middle Americans can overwhelm our Capitol, and the Capitol police, who are funded to the tune of billions of dollars, can't stop a bunch of middle-aged individuals from walking onto the floor, we have a serious problem with our nation's security." He expressed disapproval of the United States House Select Committee on the January 6 Attack, terming it a "Nancy Pelosi committee determined to find someone that they can hang a noose around."

Electoral history

2014

2016

2018

2022

Personal life
Nunn is married and has children. He is Roman Catholic.

References

External links 
Congressman Zach Nunn official U.S. House website
 
 
 

|-

1979 births
21st-century Roman Catholics
Air Command and Staff College alumni
Alumni of the University of Cambridge
Catholic politicians from Iowa
Catholics from Iowa
Drake University alumni
Living people
Obama administration personnel
People from Altoona, Iowa
People from Story City, Iowa
Republican Party Iowa state senators
Republican Party members of the Iowa House of Representatives
Republican Party members of the United States House of Representatives from Iowa
United States Air Force officers
United States National Security Council staffers